Friedrich Max Müller (6 December 1823 – 28 October 1900) was a German-born philologist and Orientalist, who lived and studied in Britain for most of his life. He was one of the founders of the western academic disciplines of Indian studies and religious studies ('science of religion', German: Religionswissenschaft). Müller wrote both scholarly and popular works on the subject of Indology. The Sacred Books of the East, a 50-volume set of English translations, was prepared under his direction. He also promoted the idea of a Turanian family of languages.

Early life and education
Max Müller was born into a cultured family on 6 December 1823 in Dessau, the son of Wilhelm Müller, a lyric poet whose verse Franz Schubert had set to music in his song-cycles Die schöne Müllerin, and Winterreise. His mother, Adelheid Müller (née von Basedow), was the eldest daughter of a prime minister of Anhalt-Dessau. Carl Maria von Weber was a godfather.

Müller was named after his mother's elder brother, Friedrich, and after the central character, Max, in Weber's opera Der Freischütz. Later in life, he adopted Max as a part of his surname, believing that the prevalence of Müller as a name made it too common. His name was also recorded as "Maximilian" on several official documents (e.g. university register, marriage certificate), on some of his honours and in some other publications.

Müller entered the gymnasium (grammar school) at Dessau when he was six years old. In 1835, at the age of twelve, he was sent to live in the house of Professor Carus and attend the Nicolai School at Leipzig, where he continued his studies of music and classics. It was during his time in Leipzig that he frequently met Felix Mendelssohn.

In need of a scholarship to attend Leipzig University, Müller successfully sat his abitur examination at Zerbst. While preparing, he found that the syllabus differed from what he had been taught, necessitating that he rapidly learn mathematics, modern languages and science. He entered Leipzig University in 1841 to study philology, leaving behind his early interest in music and poetry. Müller received his Ph.D. degree in Sep 1843. His final dissertation was on Spinoza's Ethics. He also displayed an aptitude for classical languages, learning Greek, Latin, Arabic, Persian and Sanskrit.

Academic career

In 1850 Müller was appointed deputy Taylorian professor of modern European languages at Oxford University. In the following year, at the suggestion of Thomas Gaisford, he was made an honorary M.A. and a member of the college of Christ Church, Oxford. On succeeding to the full professorship in 1854, he received the full degree of M.A. by Decree of Convocation. In 1858 he was elected to a life fellowship at All Souls' College.

He was defeated in the 1860 election for the position of Boden Professor of Sanskrit, which was a "keen disappointment" to him. Müller was far better qualified for the post than the other candidate (Monier Monier-Williams), but Müller's broad theological views, Lutheranism, German birth, and lack of practical first-hand knowledge of India spoke against him. After the election he wrote to his mother, "all the best people voted for me, the Professors almost unanimously, but the vulgus profanum made the majority".

Later in 1868, Müller became Oxford's first professor of comparative philology, a position founded on his behalf. He held this chair until his death, although he retired from its active duties in 1875.

Scholarly and literary works

Sanskrit studies
In 1844, prior to commencing his academic career at Oxford, Müller studied in Berlin with Friedrich Schelling. He began to translate the Upanishads for Schelling, and continued to research Sanskrit under Franz Bopp, the first systematic scholar of the Indo-European languages (IE). Schelling led Müller to relate the history of language to the history of religion. At this time, Müller published his first book, a German translation of the Hitopadesa, a collection of Indian fables.

In 1845, Müller moved to Paris to study Sanskrit under Eugène Burnouf. Burnouf encouraged him to publish the complete Rigveda, making use of the manuscripts available in England. He moved to England in 1846 to study Sanskrit texts in the collection of the East India Company. He supported himself at first with creative writing, his novel German Love being popular in its day.

Müller's connections with the East India Company and with Sanskritists based at Oxford University led to a career in Britain, where he eventually became the leading intellectual commentator on the culture of India. At the time, Britain controlled this territory as part of its Empire. This led to complex exchanges between Indian and British intellectual culture, especially through Müller's links with the Brahmo Samaj.

Müller's Sanskrit studies came at a time when scholars had started to see language development in relation to cultural development. The recent discovery of the Indo-European language group had started to lead to much speculation about the relationship between Greco-Roman cultures and those of more ancient peoples. In particular the Vedic culture of India was thought to have been the ancestor of European Classical cultures. Scholars sought to compare the genetically related European and Asian languages to reconstruct the earliest form of the root-language. The Vedic language, Sanskrit, was thought to be the oldest of the IE languages.

Müller devoted himself to the study of this language, becoming one of the major Sanskrit scholars of his day. He believed that the earliest documents of Vedic culture should be studied to provide the key to the development of pagan European religions, and of religious belief in general. To this end, Müller sought to understand the most ancient of Vedic scriptures, the Rig-Veda. Müller translated the Rigveda Samhita book written by the 14th century Sanskrit scholar Sayanacharya from Sanskrit to English. Müller was greatly impressed by Ramakrishna Paramhansa, his contemporary and proponent of Vedantic philosophy, and wrote several essays and books about him.

For Müller, the study of the language had to relate to the study of the culture in which it had been used. He came to the view that the development of languages should be tied to that of belief-systems. At that time the Vedic scriptures were little-known in the West, though there was increasing interest in the philosophy of the Upanishads. Müller believed that the sophisticated Upanishadic philosophy could be linked to the primitive henotheism of early Vedic Brahmanism from which it evolved. He had to travel to London to look at documents held in the collection of the British East India Company. While there he persuaded the company to allow him to undertake a critical edition of the Rig-Veda, a task he pursued over many years (1849–1874). He completed the critical edition for which he is most remembered.

For Müller, the culture of the Vedic peoples represented a form of nature worship, an idea clearly influenced by Romanticism. Müller shared many of the ideas associated with Romanticism, which coloured his account of ancient religions, in particular his emphasis on the formative influence on early religion of emotional communion with natural forces. He saw the gods of the Rig-Veda as active forces of nature, only partly personified as imagined supernatural persons. From this claim Müller derived his theory that mythology is "a disease of language". By this he meant that myth transforms concepts into beings and stories. In Müller's view, "gods" began as words constructed to express abstract ideas, but were transformed into imagined personalities. Thus the Indo-European father-god appears under various names: Zeus, Jupiter, Dyaus Pita. For Müller all these names can be traced to the word "Dyaus", which he understood to imply "shining" or "radiance". This leads to the terms "deva", "deus", "theos" as generic terms for a god, and to the names "Zeus" and "Jupiter" (derived from deus-pater). In this way a metaphor becomes personified and ossified. This aspect of Müller's thinking was later explored similarly by Nietzsche.

Gifford Lectures

In 1888, Müller was appointed Gifford Lecturer at the University of Glasgow. These Gifford Lectures were the first in an annual series, given at several Scottish universities, that has continued to the present day. Over the next four years, Müller gave four series of lectures. The titles and order of the lectures were as follows:

 Natural Religion. This first course of lectures was intended as purely introductory, and had for its object a definition of Natural Religion in its widest sense.
 Physical Religion. This second course of lectures was intended to show how different nations had arrived at a belief in something infinite behind the finite, in something invisible behind the visible, in many unseen agents or gods of nature, until they reached a belief in one god above all those gods. In short, a history of the discovery of the infinite in nature.
 Anthropological Religion. This third course was intended to show how different nations arrived at a belief in a soul, how they named its various faculties, and what they imagined about its fate after death.
 Theosophy or Psychological Religion. The fourth and last course of lectures was intended to examine the relation between God and the soul ("these two Infinites"), including the ideas that some of the principal nations of the world have formed concerning this relation. Real religion, Müller asserted, is founded on a true perception of the relation of the soul to God and of God to the soul; Müller wanted to prove that this was true, not only as a postulate, but as an historical fact. The original title of the lectures was 'Psychological Religion' but Müller felt compelled to add 'Theosophy' to it. Müller's final Gifford Lecture is significant in interpreting his work broadly, as he situates his philological and historical research within a Hermetic and mystical theological project.

As translator
In 1881, he published a translation of the first edition of Kant's Critique of Pure Reason. He agreed with Schopenhauer that this edition was the most direct and honest expression of Kant's thought. His translation corrected several errors that were committed by previous translators. In his Translator's Preface, Müller wrote 

Müller continued to be influenced by the Kantian Transcendentalist model of spirituality, and was opposed to Darwinian ideas of human development. He argued that "language forms an impassable barrier between man and beast."

Views on India

Early career
On 25 August 1866, Müller wrote to Chevalier Bunsen:

In his  career, Müller several times expressed the view that a "reformation" within Hinduism needed to occur, comparable to the Christian Reformation. In his view, "if there is one thing which a comparative study of religions places in the clearest light, it is the inevitable decay to which every religion is exposed... Whenever we can trace back a religion to its first beginnings, we find it free from many blemishes that affected it in its later states".

He used his links with the Brahmo Samaj to encourage such a reformation on the lines pioneered by Ram Mohan Roy. Müller believed that the Brahmos would engender an Indian form of Christianity and that they were in practice "Christians, without being Roman Catholics, Anglicans or Lutherans". In the Lutheran tradition, he hoped that the "superstition" and idolatry, which he considered to be characteristic of modern popular Hinduism, would disappear.

Müller wrote: 
The translation of the Veda will hereafter tell to a great extent on the fate of India, and on the growth of millions of souls in that country. It is the root of their religion, and to show them what the root is, I feel sure, is the only way of uprooting all that has sprung from it during the last 3,000 years... one ought to be up and doing what may be God's work.

Müller hoped that increased funding for education in India would promote a new form of literature combining Western and Indian traditions. In 1868 he wrote to George Campbell, the newly appointed Secretary of State for India:

Late career

In his sixties and seventies, Müller gave a series of lectures, which reflected a more nuanced view in favour of Hinduism and the ancient literature from India. In his "What can India teach us?" lecture at University of Cambridge, he championed ancient Sanskrit literature and India as follows:

He also conjectured that the introduction of Islam in India in the 11th century had a deep effect on the psyche and behaviour of Hindus in another lecture, "Truthful Character of the Hindus":

Swami Vivekananda, who was the foremost disciple of Ramakrishna Paramahamsa, met Müller over a lunch on 28 May 1896. Regarding Müller and his wife, the Swami later wrote:

Controversies

Anti-Christian
During the course of his Gifford Lectures on the subject of "natural religion", Müller was severely criticised for being anti-Christian. In 1891, at a meeting of the Established Presbytery of Glasgow, Mr. Thomson (Minister of Ladywell) moved a motion that Müller's teaching was "subversive of the Christian faith, and fitted to spread pantheistic and infidel views amongst the students and others" and questioned Müller's appointment as lecturer. An even stronger attack on Müller was made by Monsignor Alexander Munro in St Andrew's Cathedral. Munro, an officer of the Roman Catholic Church in Scotland (and Provost of the Catholic Cathedral of Glasgow from 1884 to 1892), declared that Müller's lectures "were nothing less than a crusade against Divine revelation, against Jesus Christ, and against Christianity". The blasphemous lectures were, he continued, "the proclamation of atheism under the guise of pantheism" and "uprooted our idea of God, for it repudiated the idea of a personal God".

Similar accusations had already led to Müller's exclusion from the Boden chair in Sanskrit in favour of the conservative Monier Monier-Williams. By the 1880s Müller was being courted by Charles Godfrey Leland, medium Helena Blavatsky, and other writers who were seeking to assert the merits of "pagan" religious traditions over Christianity. The designer Mary Fraser Tytler stated that Müller's book Chips from a German Workshop (a collection of his essays) was her "Bible", which helped her to create a multi-cultural sacred imagery.

Müller distanced himself from these developments, and remained within the Lutheran faith in which he had been brought up. According to G. Beckerlegge, "Müller's background as a Lutheran German and his identification with the Broad Church party" led to "suspicion by those opposed to the political and religious positions that they felt Müller represented", particularly his latitudinarianism.

Although Müller took a strong religious and academic interest in Hinduism and other non-Christian religions, and often compared Christianity to religions that many traditional Protestants would have regarded as primitive or false, he grounded his Perennialism in a belief that Christianity possessed the fullest truth of all living religions. Twenty-first century scholars of religion, far from accusing Müller of being anti-Christian, have critically examined Müller's theological project as evidence for a bias towards Christian conceptions of God in early academic religious studies.

Darwin disagreement
Müller attempted to formulate a philosophy of religion that addressed the crisis of faith engendered by the historical and critical study of religion by German scholars on the one hand, and by the Darwinian revolution on the other. He was wary of Darwin's work on human evolution, and attacked his view of the development of human faculties. His work was taken up by cultural commentators such as his friend John Ruskin, who saw it as a productive response to the crisis of the age (compare Matthew Arnold's "Dover Beach"). He analyzed mythologies as rationalisations of natural phenomena, primitive beginnings that we might denominate "protoscience" within a cultural evolution. Müller also proposed an early, mystical interpretation of theistic evolution, using Darwinism as a critique of mechanical philosophy.

In 1870 Müller gave a short course of three lectures for the British Institution on language as the barrier between man and beast, which he called "On Darwin's Philosophy of Language". Müller specifically disagreed with Darwin's theories on the origin of language and that the language of man could have developed from the language of animals. In 1873, he sent a copy of his lectures to Darwin reassuring him that, though he differed from some of Darwin's conclusions, he was one of his "diligent readers and sincere admirers".

Aryanism
Müller's work contributed to the developing interest in Aryan culture, which often set Indo-European ("Aryan") traditions in opposition to Semitic religions. He was "deeply saddened by the fact that these classifications later came to be expressed in racist terms", as this was far from his intention. For Müller, the discovery of common Indian and European ancestry was a powerful argument against racism, arguing that "an ethnologist who speaks of Aryan race, Aryan blood, Aryan eyes and hair, is as great a sinner as a linguist who speaks of a dolichocephalic dictionary or a brachycephalic grammar" and that "the blackest Hindus represent an earlier stage of Aryan speech and thought than the fairest Scandinavians".

Turanian
Müller put forward and promoted the theory of a "Turanian" family of languages or speech, comprising the Finnic, Samoyedic, "Tataric" (Turkic), Mongolic, and Tungusic languages.<ref>Müller, M. (1854) The last results of the researches respecting the non-Iranian and non-Semitic languages of Asia or Europe, or the Turanian family of language. (Letter of Professor Max Müller to Chevalier Bunsen; Oxford August 1853; on the classification of the Turanian languages). In, Christian Bunsen (1854) Outlines of the Philosophy of Universal History, Applied to Language and Religion. In Two Volumes. Vol. 1. London: Brown, Green, and Longmans.</ref> According to Müller, these five languages were those "spoken in Asia or Europe not included under the Arian [sic] and Semitic families, with the exception perhaps of the Chinese and its dialects". In addition, they were "nomadic languages," in contrast to the other two families (Aryan and Semitic), which he called State or political languages.

The idea of a Turanian family of languages was not accepted by everyone at the time. Although the term "Turanian" quickly became an archaism (unlike "Aryan"), it did not disappear completely. The idea was absorbed later into nationalist ideologies in Hungary and Turkey.

Honours

In 1869, Müller was elected to the French Académie des Inscriptions et Belles-Lettres as a foreign correspondent (associé étranger).

In June 1874, Müller was awarded the Pour le Mérite (civil class), much to his surprise. Soon after, when he was commanded to dine at Windsor, he wrote to Prince Leopold to ask if he might wear his Order, and the wire came back, "Not may, but must."

In 1875, Müller was awarded the Bavarian Maximilian Order for Science and Art. The award is given to acknowledge excellent and outstanding achievements in the field of science and art. In a letter to his mother dated 19 December, Müller wrote that the award was more showy than the Pour le Mérite, "but that is the best".

In 1896, Müller was appointed a member of the Privy Council.

Personal life
Müller became a naturalized British citizen in 1855, at the age of 32.

He married Georgina Adelaide Grenfell on 3 August 1859 after overcoming the opposition from her family. The couple had four children – Ada, Mary, Beatrice and William Grenfell – of whom two predeceased them.

Georgina (died 1919) had his papers and correspondence bound; they are at the Bodleian Library, Oxford.

Death and legacy
Müller's health began deteriorating in 1898 and he died at his home in Oxford on 28 October 1900. He was interred at Holywell Cemetery on 1 November 1900.

After his death a memorial fund, the Max Müller Memorial Fund, was opened at Oxford for "the promotion of learning and research in all matters relating to the history and archaeology, the languages, literatures, and religions of ancient India".

Harry Smith stated of his film Heaven and Earth Magic: "The first part depicts the heroine's toothache consequent to the loss of a valuable watermelon, her dentistry and transportation to heaven. Next follows an elaborate exposition of the heavenly land in terms of Israel, Montreal and the second part depicts the return to earth from being eaten by Max Müller on the day Edward the Seventh dedicated the Great Sewer of London."

The Goethe Institutes in India are named Max Müller Bhavan in his honour, as is a street (Max Mueller Marg) in New Delhi.

Müller's biographies include those by Lourens van den Bosch (2002), Jon R. Stone (2002) and Scholar Extraordinary (1974) by Nirad C. Chaudhuri, the last of which was awarded the Sahitya Akademi Award for English by Sahitya Akademi, India's National Academy of Letters. Stephen G. Alter's (2005) work contains a chapter on Müller's rivalry with the American linguist William Dwight Whitney.

Publications

Müller's scholarly works, published separately as well as an 18-volume Collected Works, include:
 
 
 Lectures on the Science of Language were translated into Russian in 1866 and published at the first Russian scientific linguistic magazine "Filologicheskie Zapiski".Chips from a German Workshop (1867–1875, 5 vols.)Introduction to the Science of Religion (1873)
 
 
 Biographical Essays (1884)
 
 
 The Science of Thought (1887, 2 vols.)
 
 F. Max Müller (1888) Biographies of Words and the Home of the AryasSix Systems of Hindu Philosophy (1899)
Gifford Lectures of 1888–1892 (Collected Works, vols. 1–4)
Natural Religion (1889)
Physical Religion (1891) 
Anthropological Religion (1892)
Theosophy, or Psychological Religion (1893)Auld Lang Syne (1898, 2 vols.), a memoirMy Autobiography: A Fragment (1901) 

References

Cited sources

Further reading
 
 
 
 
 
 John R. Davis and Angus Nicholls, eds. (2017) Friedrich Max Müller and the Role of Philology in Victorian Thought. Routledge
 John R. Davis and Angus Nicholls (2016), "Friedrich Max Müller: The Career and Intellectual Trajectory of a German Philologist in Victorian Britain". Publications of the English Goethe Society 85, no. 2-3 (2016): 67–97
 Arie Molendijk (2016). Friedrich Max Müller and the Sacred Books of the East. Oxford University Press.
 Joan Leopold, "Steinthal and Max Müller: Comparative Lives", Chajim H. Steinthal, Sprachwissenschaflter und Philosoph im 19. Jahrhundert. Linguist and Philosopher in the 19th Century, eds. Hartwig Wiedebach and Annette Winkelmann. Leiden, Boston, Köln: Brill, 2002 (= Studies in European Judaism, IV), pp. 31–49.
 Joan Leopold,"Max Müller and the Linguistic Study of Civilization“ and Editor. Friedrich Max Müller, "Comparative Philology of the Indo-european languages in its bearing on the early civilisation of Mankind"  (1849), in Contributions to Comparative Indo-European, African and Chinese Linguistics: Max Müller and Steinthal. Dordrecht and Boston: Springer, 1999, pp. 1–206. [= Prix Volney Essay Series, III] With full bibliography of works.
 Joan Leopold, "Ethnic Stereotypes in Linguistics: The Case of Friedrich Max Müller (1847–1851)", Papers in the History of Linguistics [delivered at Princeton, 1984] eds. H. Aarsleff, L. G. Kelly and H.-J. Niederehe. Amsterdam and Philadelphia: J. Benjamins, 1987, pp. 501–12.
 Joan Leopold, "Friedrich Max Müller and the question of the early Indo Europeans (1847–1851)", Etudes inter-ethniques, Annales du Centre d'études supérieures et de recherches sur les relations ethniques et le racisme (Paris), VII (1984), 21–32.
 Joan Leopold, "Britische Anwendungen der arischen Rassentheorie auf Indien 1850 70", Saeculum, XXV (1974), 386–411. (trans. of following item)
 Joan Leopold, "British Applications of the Aryan Theory of Race to India 1850 70", The English Historical Review, LXXXIX (1974), 578–603. (Winner of Universities Essay Prize, Royal Asiatic Society, London)
 Joan Leopold, "The Aryan Theory of Race in India 1870–1920", The Indian Economic and Social History Review, VII (1970), 271–97.
 Subin, Anna Della. Accidental Gods, Metropolitan Books, 2021.

External linksMax Müller''. (2011). In Encyclopædia Britannica. Retrieved from https://www.britannica.com/EBchecked/topic/396833/Max-Muller
 
  
 
Deutsche Liebe, Novel by F. Max Müller 1857, E-Book Edition 2011 (German), Philipp Grieb IT-Redaktion
Online Library of Liberty – Friedrich Max Müller
Gifford Lecture Series – Biography – Friedrich Max Müller by Dr Brannon Hancock
Lourens P. van den Bosch,"Theosophy or Pantheism?: Friedrich Max Müller's Gifford Lectures on Natural Religion": full text of the article
Vedas and Upanishads
Vivekananda on Max Müller
Friedrich Max Müller, The Hymns of the Rigveda, with Sayana's commentary London, 1849–74, 2nd ed. 4 vols., Oxford, 1890–92. PDF format.

1823 births
1900 deaths
People from Dessau-Roßlau
People from Anhalt-Dessau
German orientalists
German philologists
British Indologists
Indo-Europeanists
Linguists of Indo-European languages
Religious studies scholars
Fellows of All Souls College, Oxford
German emigrants to the United Kingdom
Members of the Privy Council of the United Kingdom
Recipients of the Pour le Mérite (civil class)
19th-century German translators
Diebold Professors of Comparative Philology
19th-century British historians
19th-century British male writers
German Sanskrit scholars
Paleolinguists
Yoga scholars
Burials at Holywell Cemetery
Translators of Immanuel Kant